New Money is an American crime drama film written and directed by Jason B. Kohl. It stars Louisa Krause, Robin Weigert, Brendan Sexton III and Chelcie Ross. The plot follows a pet store worker who kidnaps her estranged father after he cuts her out of his will. The film had its world premiere at the Tallinn Black Nights Film Festival, and won the audience award at the 2018 Indie Memphis Film Festival. The film was released on April 16, 2019 by Gravitas Ventures.

Plot 
The film opens on Debbie Tisdale’s 30th birthday. Her gift is supposed to be a small inheritance of $50,000 from her estranged father Boyd, but she soon learns that Boyd, under the influence of his younger wife Rose, has cut Debbie out of his will. Debbie suspects foul play; Boyd suffers from dementia and could have easily been manipulated.

After a failed negotiation, Debbie and her boyfriend Steve kidnap Boyd and head north, where they break into an elegant lake house, empty for the season. Once there Debbie forms a plan to access to her inheritance by darker means.

Cast 
Louisa Krause as Debbie Tisdale
Brendan Sexton III as Steve Purdy
Chelcie Ross as Boyd Tisdale
Robin Weigert as Rose Tisdale
David W. Thompson as Chris
Tom Wopat as John Breckner

Production 
The film was shot on location in Lansing and Detroit, Michigan. It was the first feature film to shoot in Michigan after Governor Snyder eliminated the state's film tax credit.

Release
The film had its world premiere in November 2017 at the Tallinn Black Nights Film Festival. It continued to play various film festivals including the 2018 Newport Beach Film Festival. It screened in competition at the 2018 Indie Memphis Film Festival, where it won both best poster and the audience award.

The film was released on April 16, 2019 in the US by Gravitas Ventures, followed by a theatrical release in Germany and Austria.

Reception

Critical response
On Rotton Tomatoes, New Money has an approval rating of 60% based on 5 reviews.

Film Threat gave the film a rating of 9 out of 10, calling it "a smart, engaging thriller. Kohl has delivered a perfectly encapsulated Coen brothers-style narrative with airtight precision... New Money serves as an excellent reminder of where desperation can lead if we let it get the better of us."

Douglas Davidson, writing for Elements of Madness, wrote "New Money is a powder keg of emotion... beautifully shot, scored and performed." Vanessa Stewart of Mother of Movies singled out the performances, writing "The cast glow with perfectly-attuned performances... this is not a movie to be missed." David Duprey, writing for That Moment In, called the film "well made and deeply authentic".

External links

References 

2017 films
2017 crime drama films
2017 independent films
Films shot in Michigan
American crime drama films
American independent films
2010s English-language films
2010s American films